Floris Gerts (born 3 May 1992 in Maastricht) is a Dutch cyclist, who most recently rode for Dutch amateur team Mooi Jong–HSK Trias.

Major results

2013
 1st Grand Prix de la Magne
 1st Stage 2 Tour de Franche-Comté
 8th Ronde van Midden-Nederland
2014
 1st Kermesse de Zele
 6th Antwerpse Havenpijl
 9th Gooikse Pijl
2015
 1st Dorpenomloop Rucphen
 1st Omloop Het Nieuwsblad U23
 1st Stage 2 Triptyque Ardennais
 2nd Internationale Wielertrofee Jong Maar Moedig
 3rd Grand Prix Impanis-Van Petegem
 4th Japan Cup
 8th Flèche Ardennaise
 9th Overall Tour de Normandie
1st Stage 6
2016
 1st Volta Limburg Classic
 7th London–Surrey Classic
2017
 10th Tacx Pro Classic
2018
 4th Grote Prijs Stad Zottegem
 4th Druivenkoers Overijse
 7th Ronde van Drenthe
2019
 5th Paris–Troyes

References

External links

1992 births
Living people
Dutch male cyclists
People from Voorschoten
Cyclists from South Holland
20th-century Dutch people
21st-century Dutch people